Kapfenberg Bulls, also known simply as  Bulls, is a professional basketball club that is based in Kapfenberg, Styria, Austria.

History
Since 1991, the Kapfenberg Bulls have played in the Österreichische Basketball Bundesliga, the highest Austrian professional basketball league. Between 2001 and 2004, the club had its most successful era, with 4 national domestic league championships in a row. They won their last national title in 2007 (Austrian Basketball Cup). In 2009, they came in third in the Central European Basketball League, which is the best result of an Austrian basketball team in an international tournament.

In 2017, the Kapfenberg Bulls conquered its fifth national domestic league championship, 13 years after their previous one, and repeated success in the next season.

Honors
 Austrian Basketball Bundesliga (7): 
2000–01, 2001–02, 2002–03, 2003–04, 2016–17, 2017–18, 2018–19
 Austrian Cup (6): 
2007, 2014, 2017, 2018, 2019, 2020
Austrian Supercup (5):
2002, 2003, 2014, 2017, 2018

Season by season

Players

Current roster

Notable players

To appear in this section a player must have either: played at least one season for the club, set a club record or won an individual award while at the club, played at least one official international match for their national team at any time or performed very successfully during period in the club or at later/previous stages of his career.
 Mark Sanchez (2 seasons: 2012–14)
 De'Teri Mayes (2 seasons: 2011–13)
 Moritz Lanegger (5 seasons: 2006–11)
 Quentin Pryor (1 season: 2012–13)

External links
 www.ece-bulls.com 
 Eurobasket.com Kapfenberg Bulls Page

Basketball teams in Austria
Basketball teams established in 1976
Kapfenberg